The Santa Barbara Civic Light Opera (SBCLO) was a theatre company in Santa Barbara, California.

SBCLO staged hundreds of performances in the Lobero Theatre, and later the Granada Theater in Santa Barbara before going bankrupt. The company was founded by Paul Iannoccone and Elise Unruh in 1984 and continued to produce shows until filing for bankruptcy in 2001.

SBCLO became the short-lived Musical Theater of Santa Barbara (MTSB) before finally discontinuing productions altogether.

References

Santa Barbara, California
Musical theatre companies
Theatre companies in California
Entertainment companies established in 1984
Performing groups established in 1984
1984 establishments in California
Musical groups disestablished in 2001
2001 disestablishments in California